Aurelio "Rail" Grisanty (born 1949 in the Dominican Republic) is a Dominican-born American painter, graphic artist, muralist, set and costume designer, entrepreneur, and the principal artist of the Beach Town Posters ongoing series of vintage Art Deco-style prints.

Early life and education
Grisanty was born under politically oppressive circumstances in the Dominican Republic. As a child, he spent hours in his grandparents' garden observing colors, textures and lighting. Grisanty wrote: "There, I learned how green is shaded by red. How, without direct light, yellows become brown. How purple unveils its reds and blues in a transparency. And black does not exist. I learned that small things can make a big context and vice versa. I learned that the character of man is as complex as Nature."

As a teenager, Grisanty studied drawing with Dominican artist Yoryi Morel from 1963 to 1964, studied graphic arts and painting in Mexico City from 1969 to 1974, and studied interior design at the Universidad Nacional Pedro Henríquez Ureña in Santo Domingo, Dominican Republic.

Career
From 1974 to 1976, Grisanty designed and directed the Graphic Arts Department at the Universidad Autónoma de Santo Domingo. At the time, he became involved in designing theatrical sets and costumes in Santo Domingo, most notably for a production of Salome, directed by cinematographer Jean-Louis Jorge. Grisanty then served as the director for the graphic-design department of the advertising agency Retho Publicidad in Santo Domingo.

Grisanty moved to Washington, D.C., in 1984 and pursued a career as a painter and graphic artist. He moved to Rehoboth Beach, Delaware, in 2004. One year later, he co-founded Beach Town Posters, a series of fine-art posters celebrating American beach towns, rendered in a vintage Art Deco style. The inspiration for Beach Town Posters came from the French vacation posters that decorated his childhood beach home. Grisanty is the sole artist for the ongoing series.

Grisanty has won a series of awards for his stage and costume design and individual artworks. His notable career achievements include winning the Special Prize from the Jury at the Santo Domingo Art Biennial in 1976, and being declared an "Exceptional Individual of International Renown" during his citizenship process by the U.S. government in 1997.

Individual exhibits

 1974 Centro Cultural Dominicano, Santo Domingo
 1979 Centro de La Cultura, Santiago, Dominican Republic
 1979 Museo de las Casas Reales, Santo Domingo
 1981 Puerto Plata Art, Dominican Republic
 1982 Altos de Chavon, La Romana, Donminican Republic
 1982 Casa de La Cultura Hispanica, Santo Domingo
 1983 Centro de Arte Nouveau, Santo Domingo
 1986 La Galeria, Santo Domingo
 1987 Cameron Cobb Gallery, Atlanta, Georgia
 1988 Cameron Cobb Gallery, Atlanta, Georgia
 1988 La Galeria, Santo Domingo
 1989 Carlton Cobb Gallery, Atlanta, Georgia
 1990 Lowe Gallery, Atlanta, Georgia
 1992 Museo National de Arte Moderno, Santo Domingo
 1995 Museo de las Casas Reales, Santo Domingo
 2002 Artist's Museum, Washington, D.C.
 2009 Gallery 50, Rehoboth Beach, Delaware

Group and museum exhibits 

 1976 Museo del Hombre Dominicano
 1977 Michigan Council for the Arts
 1981 Museum of Modern Art, Santo Domingo
 1983 Valparaiso Biennial, Chile
 1985 University of Pittsburgh, Pennsylvania
 1988 Cuban Museum of Art, Miami, Florida
 1991 IDB, Nagoya, Japan
 1993 Mexican Cultural Institute, Washington, D.C.
 1994 AT&T, Washington, D.C.
 1994 Brazilian Cultural Institute, Washington, D.C.
 1996 George Mason University, Virginia
 1998 Ada Balcacer Gallery, Santo Domingo
 1998 Mexican Cultural Institute, Washington, D.C.

See also

 List of American artists 1900 and after
 List of Dominican painters
 List of people from Delaware
 List of people from Washington, D.C.

References

External links 
 Beach Town Posters Web site
 Aurelio Grisanty Web site

Date of birth missing (living people)
Place of birth missing (living people)
1949 births
20th-century American painters
American male painters
21st-century American painters
American costume designers
American graphic designers
American muralists
American scenic designers
Art Deco artists
Painters from Delaware
Dominican Republic emigrants to the United States
Dominican Republic painters
Hispanic and Latino American artists
Living people
Mixed-media artists
Rehoboth Beach, Delaware
Painters from Washington, D.C.
People from Rehoboth Beach, Delaware
American poster artists
Universidad Nacional Pedro Henríquez Ureña alumni
20th-century American male artists